Frank Ronald Fernández Pardo (born 26 February 1992), is a Chilean footballer  who plays as a striker for Colchagua in the Chilean Segunda División.

Career
Frank did all lower in Universidad Católica but his debut was in Trasandino.

External links
 
 Frank Fernández at playmakerstats.com (English version of ceroacero.es)

1992 births
Living people
People from Los Andes Province, Chile
People from Valparaíso Region
Chilean footballers
Club Deportivo Universidad Católica footballers
Trasandino footballers
Rangers de Talca footballers
Deportes Copiapó footballers
Deportes Colchagua footballers
Chilean Primera División players
Primera B de Chile players
Segunda División Profesional de Chile players
Association football forwards